IC 167 is a barred spiral galaxy in the constellation of Aries. It was first reported by Bigourdan in 1891 and included in Dreyer's first Index Catalogue.

Galaxy group information
IC 167 is a member of the NGC 697 group. There is some evidence that IC 167 is interacting with nearby NGC 694 as they seem to share HI regions. The tidal warping of IC 167 also is indicative of an interaction with another galaxy. How long the interaction between these two galaxies has been occurring is the subject of current research.

References

External links

IC 0167
0167
01313
031
6833
Interacting galaxies